Wyke Hamon is a manor in Wicken, Northamptonshire, England. In the early 16th century it was owned by John Spencer of the prominent Spencer family of aristocrats.

References

Bibliography

External links
Wicken,Northamptonshire - Archaeological Evaluation and Assessment of Results, Wessex Archaeology, Feb 2008

Houses in Northamptonshire